Pacifica Salud is a hospital in Panama City, Panama. It is the only hospital in Central America to be affiliated with Johns Hopkins Medicine International. Attracting medical tourism is a major component of its operating plan.

References

Hospitals in Panama
Buildings and structures in Panama City
Hospitals established in 1999
1999 establishments in Panama